Worachit Kanitsribampen (also spelled Kanitsribumphen, born 24 August 1997) is a Thai professional footballer who plays as an attacking midfielder for Thai League 1 club Port, on loan from BG Pathum United, and the Thailand national team. His goal during the Thai League Week 11 against Muangthong United is considered one of the top 5 goals of the round in an article by FOX Sports Asia.

Early career
In 2009, Worachit joined Chonburi's academy at the age of 11. 
In 2013, Worachit went on a two-week trial with Thai-owned English club Leicester City. In 2015, Worachit went on a two-week trial with Japan club FC Tokyo.

Club career
In 2014, at the age of 16, Worachit debuted for Chonburi's senior team in the second leg of the 2014 Thai Premier League against Samut Songkhram. In the same year, Worachit was loaned to Sri Racha/Ban Bueng.

In 2015, Worachit was loaned to Phan Thong in the first leg of the season. However, he returned to Chonburi in the second leg. On August 8, Worachit scored his first goal in the Thai League 1 against Ratchaburi Mitr Phol. His following goal made him the youngest player to score him the Thai League 1, at 18 years and 340 days. Worachit was subbed in the next match against BEC Tero Sasana. On August 19, Worachit started his first match for Chonburi against Buriram United.

On 14 December 2015, Worachit flew to Japan for a week-long trial with FC Tokyo, who finished 4th at the 2015 J1 League. He participated in the senior and U-18 squads.

On 27 July 2019, Worachit scored in his 100th appearance for Chonburi against PT Prachuap.

On 1 December 2021, BG Pathum United signed Worachit with a price of about 30 million baht.

International career
In 2015, Worachit was named as the Thailand U-19 team's captain for the 2015 AFF U-19 Youth Championship in Laos. He led the team to the semi-finals by winning every single match in the group stage, during which he collected three goals for himself. Worachit scored against Malaysia in the semi-finals and scored twice against Vietnam as Thailand won 6-0. Worachit became the tournament's top scorer with 6 goals.

At the age of 18, Worachit was later promoted to the Thailand U-23 team in preparation for the 2016 AFC U-23 Championship in Qatar. He scored for Thailand in his debut, which was a friendly against Suphanburi. At the 2016 AFC U-23 Championship, Worachit came off the bench in two matches of the group stage against Saudi Arabia and North Korea.

In August 2017, he won the gold medal at the 2017 Southeast Asian Games with Thailand.

In 2021, he was called up for the 2020 AFF Championship in Singapore and scored his first goal at senior level on 11 December 2021 in the match against Myanmar.

International goals

Senior team

Under-23

Under-19

Honours

Club
BG Pathum United
 Thailand Champions Cup: 2022

International
Thailand U-19
 AFF U-19 Youth Championship: 2015
Thailand U-23
 Sea Games Gold Medal: 2017; Silver Medal: 2021
 Dubai Cup: 2017
Thailand
 AFF Championship: 2020

Individual
 AFF U-19 Youth Championship Top Scorer: 2015
 FA Thailand Award Young Player of the Year: 2018
 Thai League 1 Player of the Month: November 2021

References

External links
 Profile at Goal
 

1997 births
Living people
Worachit Kanitsribampen
Worachit Kanitsribampen
Worachit Kanitsribampen
Association football midfielders
Worachit Kanitsribampen
Worachit Kanitsribampen
Worachit Kanitsribampen
Worachit Kanitsribampen
Worachit Kanitsribampen
Worachit Kanitsribampen
Worachit Kanitsribampen
Worachit Kanitsribampen
Worachit Kanitsribampen
Southeast Asian Games medalists in football
Footballers at the 2018 Asian Games
Competitors at the 2017 Southeast Asian Games
Worachit Kanitsribampen
Competitors at the 2019 Southeast Asian Games
Competitors at the 2021 Southeast Asian Games
Worachit Kanitsribampen